Vilalba is a municipality in Galicia (Spain), in the province of Lugo, on the left bank of the river Ladra, one of the headstreams of the Miño.

Pilgrim route
Vilalba is located on the old pilgrim route from western Europe to Santiago de Compostella, which enters from Burgos and Abadin to the east and crosses using the old Bridge of Martiñán in the parish of Goiriz, leaving on the west side of the town towards Baamonde, Guitiriz and León.

Journalistic tradition 
During the 20th century Vilalba had  a rich journalistic tradition that began in 1902 with the Ideal Villalbés, a newspaper handwritten by the poet and journalist Antonio García Hermida. This was continued, in a more professional form, by the El Eco de Villalba (1908) under Manuel Mato Vizoso and Novo Freire. After this were El Ratón (1910), El Vigía Villalbés (1913), Azul y Blanco (1914), Villalba y su comarca (1915), Galicia pintoresca (1916), and El Heraldo de Villalba (1916), which  consecrated García Hermida as a professional journalist.
 
The proliferation of written press does not end there, but continued with the first newspaper written entirely in Galician in the town, A Xustiza (1918). Soon there were also Aurora (1918), El Gato (1919), La Voz Villalbesa (1921), El Progreso Villalbés (1922) founded by Enríquez Chanot, El Villalbés (1925), El Villalbés de Buenos Aires (1927), and  La Unión Ciudadana (1929). In the years of the II Republic was edited a politically active newspaper, the Faro Villalbés (1932). One of their more significant columnists was Carmiña Prieto Rouco, author of the Himno da Terra Cha.

In the years of the Francoist State only two newspapers saw the light, both of which dealt mainly with sports: Stadium (1949) and El Castillo (1950). The next new newspaper did not appear until 1983, the short-lived A Voz de Vilalba.

The tree
The town is unusual in having given its name to a local tree, the Pravia, which is a white maple located near the town's Parador (a fortress converted into a hotel).

Usually the Pravia turns to a stage to celebrate Christmas and represent the traditional Nativity scene (Belenismo).

Administrative units 
The following table lists the civil parishes (parroquias) of Vilalba, with their estimated 2019 populations:

Notable Galicians born in Vilalba 
Cristina Castaño, actress
 Ramón Chao, journalist, writer, and father of singer Manu Chao
 Manuel Fraga Iribarne, Minister in Francoist Spain and President of the Galician Parliament between (1990-2005) by the Galician People's Party
 Antonio María Rouco Varela, prelate of the Roman Catholic Church

Gallery

See also
 The Andrade family, Counts of Andrade and Pontedeume, and Lords of Ferrol, Serantes and Vilar.

Notes

References

External links
 A Voz de Vilalba
 Bibliografía Chairega

Municipalities in the Province of Lugo